Erica evansii is a species of plant in the family Ericaceae found in Mozambique, South Africa, and Zimbabwe.

References

evansii
Taxa named by N. E. Brown